Angelika Buck (born 9 June 1950) is a German former ice dancer who competed for West Germany. With her brother Erich Buck, she is the 1972 European champion, a four-time World medalist, and a six-time West German national champion.

Career 
Angelika and Erich Buck were coached by Betty Callaway in Oberstdorf. They represented West Germany and the ERV Ravensburg club.

The Buck siblings were the first Germans to capture the European ice dancing title. They did so at the 1972 European Championships in Gothenburg, upsetting Lyudmila Pakhomova / Alexander Gorshkov. They also won three silver medals at Europeans and four medals at the World Championships (three silver and one bronze). They took gold at the West German Championships six times.

The Buck siblings invented the "Ravensburger Waltz", which became one of the ISU's compulsory/pattern dances. They debuted it at the 1973 German Championships.

Personal life 
Angelika Buck studied at university in Munich. She is married and has two children.

Results

References

  Munzinger
  Skate Canada 2003 Ice Dance
 Eissport Magazin 6/95, page 20

1950 births
Living people
German female ice dancers
People from Ravensburg
Sportspeople from Tübingen (region)
World Figure Skating Championships medalists
European Figure Skating Championships medalists